The women's lightweight single sculls rowing event at the 2011 Pan American Games will be held from October 16–19 at the Canoe & Rowing Course in Ciudad Guzman. This event was not held at the 2007 Pan American Games in Rio de Janeiro, Brazil.

Schedule
All times are Central Standard Time (UTC-6).

Results

Heat 1

Heat 2

Repechage

Final B

Final A

References

Women's rowing at the 2011 Pan American Games